The Federated States of Micronesia competed at the 2016 Summer Olympics in Rio de Janeiro, Brazil, from 5 to 21 August 2016. This was the nation's fifth consecutive appearance at the Summer Olympics.

Federated States of Micronesia National Olympic Committee (FSMNOC) selected a team of five athletes, two men and three women, to compete only in athletics, swimming, and women's boxing (the country's Olympic debut in Rio de Janeiro) at the Games. The nation's roster was similar to those sent to Sydney (2000), Athens (2004), and Beijing (2008). Among the Micronesian athletes were freestyle swimmer Debra Daniel, who competed in her third consecutive Games, and lightweight boxer Jennifer Chieng, who led the squad as the nation's flag bearer in the opening ceremony. Federated States of Micronesia, however, have yet to win its first ever Olympic medal.

Athletics

Federated States of Micronesia has received universality slots from IAAF to send two athletes (one male and one female) to the Olympics.

Track & road events

Boxing
 
Federated States of Micronesia have received an invitation from the Tripartite Commission to send a female boxer competing in the lightweight division to the Games, signifying the nation's debut in the sport.

Swimming

Federated States of Micronesia have received a Universality invitation from FINA to send two swimmers (one male and one female) to the Olympics.

References

External links 
 
 

Olympics
2016
Nations at the 2016 Summer Olympics